Atlanta Symphony Hall is the home venue of the Atlanta Symphony Orchestra. It is located within the Woodruff Arts Center at 1280 Peachtree Street in Atlanta, Georgia, USA.

The venue has a total capacity of 1,762 seats on three levels: 1,074 in the orchestra section, 349 in the lower balcony and 339 in the upper balcony. There are also spaces for 12 wheelchairs and 12 companion seats, as well as room for 82 additional seats in the orchestra pit, depending on the stage set-up. The first Atlanta Symphony Orchestra recording (a Robert Shaw Christmas album) was made there in 1975. Not known for its acoustic excellence, a newer hall in a different location (Atlanta Symphony Center) was proposed in the early 2005, but this project was later abandoned, due to a lack of funding. However, there are plans in place to renovate the existing hall in order to bring it up to standard.

The hall also offers wireless audio aids for audience members who are hearing impaired.

See also
The proposed Atlanta Symphony Center

External links 
 Woodruff Arts Center website

Music venues in Atlanta
Tourist attractions in Atlanta